This is a list of airlines currently operating in Jordan.

Scheduled airlines

Charter airlines

Cargo airlines

See also

 List of airlines
 List of defunct airlines of Jordan
 List of defunct airlines of Asia

Jordan
Airlines
Airlines
Jordan